Hiram E. Stilley (? - 1897) was a lawyer, public official, and mercantilist who served as a state legislator in North Carolina. He represented Beaufort County, North Carolina in the North Carolina House of Representatives and North Carolina Senate.

He also held an assessor post for the Internal Revenue Service. He was elected to the North Carolina Senate for the 1872 term.

He died at age 60.

See also
North Carolina General Assembly of 1868–1869

References

Year of birth missing
1897 deaths
Members of the North Carolina House of Representatives
North Carolina lawyers
19th-century American lawyers
People from Beaufort County, North Carolina
19th-century American politicians
North Carolina state senators
1830s births